Buksa, also known as Buksari and Bhoksa, is an Indo-Aryan language spoken by the Buksa people in parts of Uttarakhand and Uttar Pradesh, India.

Within Uttarakhand, most speakers of Buksa are found in several dozen villages in Udham Singh Nagar district in the south-east of state, mainly in the development blocks of Bajpur and Gadarpur. There are also speakers in a number of villages in the Ramnagar area of Nainital district, as well as in the urban centres of Dehradun, Haridwar and Pauri.

Buksa has no written literature, but there is an oral tradition of folktales and folk songs.

References

Bibliography 

Indo-Aryan languages
Languages of Uttarakhand
Languages of Uttar Pradesh
Endangered languages of India